Vincent Confait (born 28 October 1959) is a Seychellois sprinter. He competed in the men's 400 metres at the 1984 Summer Olympics.

References

1959 births
Living people
Athletes (track and field) at the 1980 Summer Olympics
Athletes (track and field) at the 1984 Summer Olympics
Seychellois male sprinters
Seychellois male hurdlers
Olympic athletes of Seychelles
Place of birth missing (living people)